Decatur Island is one of the San Juan Islands in Washington state, USA, located just east of Lopez Island across Lopez Sound and just south of Blakely Island across Thatcher Pass.  Named by the Wilkes Expedition in 1841 for naval officer Stephen Decatur, it is 3.524 square miles (9.127 km²) in area.

There are no public facilities other than one public boat ramp in Davis Bay on the east side of the island. The San Juan Preservation Trust allows public day-use of their property on the southern tip of the island.

There is no Washington State Ferry service to Decatur; access is by private boat or plane.  The airport on Decatur Island is private, for residents of the Decatur Shores community only.  All other persons wishing to use the airport must obtain prior permission from the community. Paraclete Charter Service and Island Express Charters provide passenger-only ferry service to Decatur from Anacortes. Northwest Sky Ferry provides air service from Bellingham, Washington. Island Transport operates a ferry/barge, transporting cargo and vehicles from Skyline Marina in Anacortes to the public boat ramp.

There is a school for kindergarten through eighth grade. There is a private nine-hole rustic golf course, Memorial Day to Labor Day there is a Farmer's Market each Saturday at the country store. The 2000 census reported a resident population of 71 persons.

A post office called Decatur was established in 1891, and remained in operation until 1969.

James Island State Park is just to the east of the island.

See also

References

Decatur Island: Blocks 2102 thru 2118, Census Tract 9605, San Juan County, Washington United States Census Bureau

San Juan Islands
Populated places in San Juan County, Washington